Hacienda La Sabana near Camuy, Puerto Rico, was built in c. 1773 for Don Gregorio Rodriguez.  It was listed on the National Register of Historic Places in 1985.

It is a two-story building that served both as a residence and for storage.  It is located in the middle of a "sabana" (extended plain) between the Camuy River and the Guajataca River.  Its north side faces the old main road, the Camino Real.

It was in deteriorated condition in 1983.

References

National Register of Historic Places in Puerto Rico
Buildings and structures completed in 1773
Sabana
1773 establishments in the Spanish Empire
1770s establishments in Puerto Rico
Unused buildings in Puerto Rico
Camuy, Puerto Rico